Posht Asman (also Romanized as Posht Āsmān) is a village in Howmeh Rural District, in the Central District of Deyr County, Bushehr Province, Iran. According to the 2006 census, its population was 18 people, comprised in four families.

References 

Populated places in Deyr County